The 1995 FIBA European League Final Four was the 1994–95 season's FIBA European League Final Four tournament, organized by FIBA Europe. The event was hosted at the Pabellón Príncipe Felipe in Zaragoza, Spain. The event was held from April 11 until April 13, 1995. Real Madrid Teka won its eighth title, after defeating Olympiacos in the final game.

Bracket

Semifinals

Limoges CSP v Real Madrid Teka

Panathinaikos v Olympiacos

Third place game

Final

Awards

FIBA European League Final Four MVP
 Arvydas Sabonis ( Real Madrid)

FIBA European League Finals Top Scorer
 Arvydas Sabonis ( Real Madrid)

FIBA European League All-Final Four Team

References

External links
1994–95 EuroLeague at FIBAEurope.com
Linguasport

1995
1994–95 in European basketball
1994–95 in Spanish basketball
1994–95 in Greek basketball
1994–95 in French basketball
International basketball competitions hosted by Spain